"Talk Like Sex" is a song by American hip hop duo Kool G Rap & DJ Polo, originally recorded for their 1990 album Wanted: Dead or Alive and later released as the second single from 1996's Rated XXX. It was also featured on the compilation albums The Best of Cold Chillin' (2000), Greatest Hits (2002) and Street Stories: The Best of Kool G Rap & DJ Polo (2013).

Background
The song first featured as the fifth track from Kool G Rap & DJ Polo's 1990 album Wanted: Dead or Alive and was later included on the 1996 album Rated XXX, which comprised a number of classics and previously unheard songs. "Talk Like Sex" was released as the second single from this album with "Fuck U Man" as a B-side.

"Talk Like Sex" was Kool G Rap's first dirty rap song and he recalled in a 2014 interview: 

A sequel to the song, "Talk Like Sex Part 2", was recorded by Smut Peddlers featuring Kool G Rap on the 2001 album Porn Again.

Samples
"Talk Like Sex" samples the following songs:
"Different Strokes" by Syl Johnson
"The Lovomaniacs" by Boobie Knight & the Universal Lady
"The Symphony" by Marley Marl featuring Big Daddy Kane, Craig G, Kool G Rap and Masta Ace

And was later sampled on:
"Fuck U Man" by Kool G Rap & DJ Polo
"Sweat of My Balls" by CB4

Track listing
A-side
 "Talk Like Sex" (5:12)

B-side
 "Fuck U Man" (4:10)

References

External links
 "Talk Like Sex" at Discogs

1990 songs
1996 singles
Kool G Rap songs
Songs written by Kool G Rap
Dirty rap songs
Cold Chillin' Records singles